Glamorgan County Cricket Club was established on 6 July 1888. The county entered the Minor Counties Championship in 1896 and competed in the competition until 1920, after which it was elevated to first-class status for the 1921 season, and has played first-class cricket since. Following their elevation to first-class status, Glamorgan alternated their home matches between Cardiff Arms Park in Cardiff and St Helen's in Swansea. It wasn't until 1966 that Glamorgan began playing at their current home ground, Sophia Gardens in Cardiff. Cardiff Arms Park played host to Glamorgan's first home fixture in first-class cricket against Sussex in 1921, as well as its first home List A fixture against Worcestershire in 1963. Forty years later Sophia Gardens played host to the club's first Twenty20 fixture against Northamptonshire. Glamorgan have played home matches at nineteen grounds, but have played the majority of their home fixtures since 1966 at the SWALEC Stadium, which also holds Test, One Day International and Twenty20 International cricket matches.

The nineteen grounds that Glamorgan have used for home matches since 1896 are listed below, with statistics complete through to the end of the 2014 season. A twentieth ground, the Newport International Sports Village (also known as Spytty Park), staged its first County Championship game in May 2019.

Grounds

Minor county
Below is a complete list of grounds used by Glamorgan County Cricket Club in Minor Counties Championship matches before its elevation to first-class status in 1921.

First-class county
Below is a complete list of grounds used by Glamorgan County Cricket Club in first-class, List A and Twenty20 matches following its elevation to first-class status in 1921.

Notes

References

Glamorgan County Cricket Club
Cricket grounds in Glamorgan
Cricket grounds in Wales
Glamorgan
Glamorgan-related lists
History of Welsh cricket